The Head of the River is a name given to annual Australian rowing regattas held in South Australia, New South Wales, Victoria, Queensland, Tasmania and Western Australia. The regattas feature competing independent schools, and the winner of the 1st division boys or girls race is crowned the "Head of the River".

The name Head of the River is taken from similar regattas held in other countries, including the Head of the River Race held annually on the Thames in London since 1926.

New South Wales

AAGPS Head of the River Regatta
The Head of the River takes place in Penrith, New South Wales, Australia at the end of the first term (normally in March) at the Sydney International Regatta Centre (SIRC). It is the culmination of the AAGPS (Athletic Association of the Great Public Schools) rowing season, and has been held since 1893, initially on the Parramatta River and then from 1936–1995 on the Nepean River. On the Nepean the senior events were the 1st VIII, 2nd VIII, 1st IV, 2nd IV, 3rd IV and 4th IV. The VIIIs rowed over a mile and a half and the IVs over a mile.

In 1996, the regatta was moved to the then preparatory Olympic course and since then raced over 2000 metres. In 2001, a 3rd VIII event and the three year 10 VIII events were added to the programme.

The competing schools are Sydney Grammar School, The King's School, Newington College, Sydney Boys' High School, The Scots College, St. Joseph's College, Saint Ignatius' College, The Armidale School and Shore School, compete at the Head of the River.

NSW Schoolgirl Head of the River Regatta 
The NSW Schoolgirl Head of the River was first raced in 1991. The inaugural Schoolgirl Head of the River Regatta took place in October 1991 on Middle Harbour Creek at Davidson Park, Roseville. The regatta is now usually held at the Sydney International Regatta Centre (SIRC), Penrith on the Saturday following the Schoolboy Head of the River. It is the culmination of the Schoolgirls rowing season that involves crews from Independent Schools, Catholic Colleges and State High Schools.

The NSW Schoolgirl Head of the River is organised by the Combined Independent Schools Sports Council. Schools that are eligible to compete in the NSW Schoolgirl Head of the River are all affiliated schools of the NSW Combined Independent Schools Sports Council (NSWCISSC), NSW Combined High Schools Sports Association (NSWCHSSA) and the NSW Combined Catholic Colleges Sports Association (NSWCCCSA). The regatta is run in accordance with Rowing NSW laws of boat racing.

In 2018, Pymble Ladies' College won the 1st VIII Race and then went on to win the Australian National Championships.

South Australia

South Australian School's Head of the River Regatta

The South Australian Head of the River is a collegiate rowing race held between the colleges and schools of Adelaide, Australia. It is the culmination of the Rowing South Australia's schools' season and is the most prestigious event on the calendar. Races are generally hard-fought, close encounters that showcase the very best of junior rowing talent, with the winning 1st VIII crew each year being crowned with the title of 'Head of the River'. Inter and Junior coxed quad crews fight for the same honour in their respective divisions. These title races come with immense pressure, with wins considered significant successes for the victorious schools and their rowing programs. The event draws huge crowds of up to 15,000 (2010) from across the state, generally consisting of school students, parent supporters, and old scholars.

The regatta is currently held at the world standard course at West Lakes International Regatta Centre and involves junior and inter coxed quadruple sculling events over 1,000m and 1,500m respectively, as well as senior coxed four and eight races over 2,000m. The South Australian Head of the River is held on the second-to-last Saturday of the first school term of each year.

The event had its inception on the Torrens Lake in 1922 as the result of a challenge between St. Peters and Adelaide High School. However St. Peters and their traditional rivals Prince Alfred have been racing for the prestigious Blackmore Shield which is to be contested only between the two schools since 1892 as part of their Intercollegiate program. When the Blackmore Shield changes hands, the Captain and Vice-Captain of Boats from the losing school present the shield to their counterparts in front of an assembly of the victorious school. Since 1923 this race has been incorporated into the Boys 1st VIII race at the Head of the River. The trophy presented to the overall winning Schoolboy 1st VIII is the Gosse Shield, which was presented by Sir John Gosse and his family as a perpetual trophy in 1932.

Competing schools are drawn from Adelaide's traditional independent schools and an increasing number of state schools. Since the 1970s the number of girls competing in the regatta has steadily increased; resulting in now larger numbers of female rowers than male competing at the regatta.  Seymour College (an all-girls school) gained entry to the regatta in 2006, and  Annesley College (an all-girls school) competed for the first time in 2007. Loreto College, Marryatville first competed in 2012 and St Peter's Collegiate Girls' School entered in 2013. Currently 15 schools compete in the regatta: 3 all boys schools, 5 all girls schools and 7 co-educational schools. At the 2019 Head of the River, hosted by Pembroke School, there were a total of 1162 athletes entered into the regatta's 36 events.

Walford Anglican School for Girls has won the Florence Eaton Cup awarded to the winning Schoolgirl 1st VIII crew a record 19 times. 

In 2022 Walford’s winning time of 6:47.75 was a course record beating the previous record of 6:48.06, held by Walford from 2010.

Until 2005 the Head of the River was officially known as the Public Schools' Regatta. The name has since been changed to the "Schools' Regatta" by the Heads of Rowing Schools Committee, a committee of the Headmasters/Principals of the Head of the River Schools.

Second VIII's 
The Clinker IV event was constituted the Second Crews's Race in 1938 and was rowed in eights from 1957.

Open, Under 16 and Under 15 
These events were rowed on fixed seats until the introduction of slides for Open and Under 16 Fours in 1937, and Under 15 Fours in 1938. In 1932 and 1933 Open Tub Slides were rowed as well as Open Fixed and were won both years by S.P.S.C.

Under 14 Quad Sculls 
Coxed quad sculls replaced sweep oar fours in division A in 1991, division B in 1992, division C in 1993.

Competing schools

South Australian Head of the River - Boys Results
 Boys Open First VIII - for The Gosse Shield

 Boys Open Second VIII - for The Wallman Trophy

 Schoolboy 1st IV - for The Cudmore Cup (2,000m)

 Boys Year 10A Quadruple Sculls - for The Menz Cup (1,500m)

 Boys Year 9A Quadruple Sculls - for The Ferguson Cup (1,000m)

South Australian Head of the River - Girls Results
 Girls Open First VIII - for The Florence Eaton Cup (2,000m)

 Girls Open 2nd VIII - for The Adelaide HS Centenary Cup (2,000m)

 Girls Year 10A Quadruple Sculls - for The Denise Collins Cup (1,500m)

Queensland

Queensland Head of the River Regatta
The Head of the River for schoolboys is contested between seven of the nine GPS (Great Public Schools) schools in Brisbane, with schools Brisbane Boys College, Brisbane Grammar School, Brisbane State High School, Anglican Church Grammar School, St. Joseph's College, Gregory Terrace, The Southport School and St. Joseph's Nudgee College competing. The GPS Head of the River has been held since 1918, with Southport winning in the inaugural year. The races have been held on the Milton Reach of the Brisbane River, Wivenhoe Dam, Hinze Dam, Lake Kawana and now race at Wyaralong Dam. Crowds of several thousand attend the annual Championship Regatta at Lake Kawana but in earlier years there are reports of both sides of the river being lined with spectators and tens of thousands attending.

Queensland Girls Head of the River Regatta
On 13 October 1990 the Inaugural Schoolgirls' Head of the River was held on the Milton Reach of the Brisbane River. The seven schools that competed were All Hallows' School, Brisbane State High School, St Aidan's Anglican Girls' School, St Hilda's School, St Margaret's Anglican Girls' School, St Peters Lutheran College and Somerville House. Sixteen events were competed with 118 competitors and 3 entries in the Open 8+. The newly formed Brisbane Schoolgirls Rowing Association conducted the Head of the River with additional competitors from Brisbane Girls' Grammar School, Clayfield College, Indooroopilly State High School, Kelvin Grove State High School and Stuartholme School. By 1992, entries in the Open 8+ had doubled to six, the number of events expanded to 19 and 11 schools competed.

Bundaberg Head of the River Regatta
A 'Head of the River' competition is also held among Bundaberg schools. It is held on an annual basis and has been for the past 18 years. All Bundaberg secondary schools except for the Bundaberg Christian College participate in the regatta. These schools are Bundaberg North SHS, Bundaberg SHS, Kepnock SHS, St. Luke's Anglican College, Gin Gin SHS and Shalom Catholic College. St Luke's Anglican recently broke Shalom's twenty year winning streak over the other schools for the travel world overall points trophy with a score of 123, to 65.

Victoria

VIC Head of the River Regatta
The Victorian race is contested between the 11 Associated Public Schools of Victoria (APS).

The race is usually the last race of the official APS rowing season and has recently been rowed on Lake Nagambie which is a full buoyed international standard course allowing six boat finals.

VIC Head of the Schoolgirls Regatta
1984 was the final year that school girls from non-APS schools participated in the APS Head of the River. As a result of being barred from further competition in the APS regatta, the Principal of Morongo Girls’ School initiated a meeting that established in the Head of School Girls’ Regatta, founded on the basic principle that any school could compete. The first HOSG was held in 1985 at Ballarat with 7 events, 16 schools and 240 competitors. In 1987, the event moved to Geelong. In 1991, the HOSG Regatta Committee became an incorporated association. In 2013 the HOSG regatta was contested by 35 schools and 1766 competitors.

Western Australia

WA Head of the River Regatta
The Perth race held in late summer/early autumn is contested between the 7 Public Schools Association members. The regatta consists of many races with points contributing to the Hamer Cup, and in the final race of the day, the 1st VIII crews from each school compete for the Head of the River trophy. Originally the race was run on the Swan River then  Canning River, near Canning Bridge. Since 2009 the event has been held at the purpose built rowing course at Champion Lakes, Kelmscott. Records have tumbled since the venue change with records set in 2009 and 2010. The current record time for the 2000m event is 5 minutes 48.2 seconds set by Trinity College.

WA Head of the Schoolgirls Regatta
In the winter several private Perth girls schools race for the title.

Tasmania 
The Tasmanian Head of the River is currently held at the Lake Barrington Rowing Course. Held over the full championship distance, the schools associated with SATIS (Sports Association of Tasmanian Independent Schools) from both the north and south of the state compete for the event. The Hutchins School, Launceston Church Grammar, The Friends School, Guilford Young College, Scotch Oakburn College, St Patrick's College and St Brendan-Shaw College all compete in the boys race, while St Michael's Collegiate School, The Friends School, Fahan School, Scotch Oakburn College, St. Patrick's College, St Mary's College and Launceston Church Grammar all compete for the girls trophy.

The Head of the River regatta is often held the Saturday before Easter. However, in 2006 the Head of the River was postponed for the first time in its Tasmanian History with a limited regatta program being amalgamated in to the Tasmanian Masters Regatta. This was able to cater for the main races with Hutchins taking out the boys' Head of the River trophy and St Michael's Collegiate School the girls.

In 2007 Scotch Oakburn won their first Head of the River in a decade in a tight race with just a second between themselves, Launceston Church Grammar and The Hutchins School. The chance for Hutchins to claim their 5th consecutive title was denied. The Friends School came a distant 4th place after much hype.
In the girls event the dominant Friends School crew won easily over Launceston Church Grammar with surprise combination coming from Fahan School gaining second place.

In 2008, The Hutchins School regained the title from Scotch Oakburn in a close race, with St Patricks college in third.

The following year, The Hutchins School won after being challenged all season by a strong St Patricks College crew. In third spot was Scotch Oakburn College.

In 2010 The Hutchins School won, having dominant performances throughout the season. Scotch Oakburn collected up second spot and the Friends crew came in third.

The 2011 Tasmanian School Boys Head of the River saw yet another dominant performance from The Hutchins School taking the win by 10 seconds from Scotch Oakburn with Friends placing third. In girls race the victors were Grammar with Scotch Oakburn placing second.

In 2012, the Head of the River Champions were Launceston Church Grammar for the girls and The Hutchins School for the boys.

In 2013, The underdog crew from Scotch Oakburn took out the Head of the River by a margin of 2 lengths to The Hutchins School,  who had a dominant season and went into the race as favourites. This prevented Hutchins from a 6th title, and gave Scotch Oakburn their first win in 6 years. Closely in 3rd, The Friends School.

 First VIII - "Tasmanian School Boys Head of the River"

References

External links 
 Rowing Australia
 Rowing Victoria
 NSW Rowing
 Rowing WA
 Rowing Queensland
 ACT Rowing
 SA Rowing Association
 Tasmanian Rowing Council
 Sydney International Rowing Centre
 Shalom Rowing

Rowing competitions in Australia
Scholastic rowing in Australia